The Settlement of Laois and Offaly 1556 was an Act of the Parliament of Ireland passed in 1556 which resulted in the creation of Queen's County and King's County in the midlands of Ireland, and the establishment of two shire towns at Maryborough (Portlaoise) and Philipstown (Daingean), named in honour of Queen Mary I and King Phillip II. The Act was the first Tudor attempt at plantation in Ireland and was designed to formally open up the area to English settlement.

The Act displaced the ruling O'More (or Moore) clan of Loígis and the O'Connor rulers of the Kingdom of Uí Failghe by declaring their lands to be the legal possession of the English monarch. In 1922, Queen's County was renamed Laois and King's County was renamed Offaly. The Act was repealed by Dáil Éireann in 1962.

References

1556 in law
1556 in Ireland
Acts of the Parliament of Ireland (pre-1801)
County Laois
County Offaly
16th century in Ireland
Ireland
 
Former English colonies
Tudor England